Daeheung may refer to:

 Daeheung, the era name of Mun of Balhae
 Daeheung, a county of South Pyongan Province, North Korea
 Daeheung-myeon, a township of Yesan County, South Chungcheong Province, South Korea
 Daeheung, a former county of South Chungcheong Province
 Daeheung-dong, 6 neighbourhoods in South Korea

See also
大興 (disambiguation)